Lorenzo Baldassarri (born 6 November 1996) is an Italian Grand Prix motorcycle racer, currently competing for GMT94 Yamaha in the 2023 Superbike World Championship. Baldassarri recently raced in the Supersport World Championship, finshing runner-up to Dominique Aegerter in the 2022 standings, but is best known for winning the 2011 Red Bull MotoGP Rookies Cup.

Career

Junior career
Baldassarri won the 2011 Red Bull MotoGP Rookies Cup with incredible consistency, despite being just 14 years old when he won the title. He won just two races, compared to runner-up Arthur Sissis winning four, but never finished outside the points, and only once finished outside the top 6, while all his rivals had multiple retirements during the season. Baldassarri won the 2011 title with 208 points, over riders like Sissis, Philipp Öttl, Florian Alt, Brad Binder, Joe Roberts, and Andrea Migno.

At age 15, not being the minimum age of 16 to enter the Moto3 championship, Baldassarri returned to the Rookies Cup for the 2012 season, but struggled with motivation, winning the second race of the season in Jerez, and then never finishing on the podium again. He ended the year 8th in the standings, with 101 points.

Moto3 World Championship
Baldassarri finally made his long awaited Grand Prix motorcycle racing debut in the 2013 Moto3 World Championship, partnering Niccolò Antonelli at Gresini Racing team. His season was a big disappointment, failing to score points in any of the 17 races that year.

Moto2 World Championship

Gresini Moto2 (2014)
Still considered an elite talent, Baldassarri was promoted to Moto2 for the 2014 season, partnering Xavier Siméon at Gresini. Baldassarri fared better, scoring points in four races, an 11th place in Barcelona, a 9th place in Assen, a 14th place in Phillip Island, and a 10th place in Valencia, scoring 20 points total for the season, and finishing 25th in the standings.

Forward Racing Team (2015–2017)
Switching teams for the 2015 season, Baldassarri would ride for Athina Forward Racing, partnered by Simone Corsi. He had a good season, finishing in the points 12 times, finishing in the top-ten 10 times, and scoring his maiden podium in the category by finishing 3rd in Australia. He ended the year 9th in the standings, with 96 points.

Staying with Forward Racing, Baldassarri's teammate for the 2016 season was Luca Marini. Baldassarri would improve again, upping last year's 3rd place with a 2nd place in his home GP in Mugello, and taking his first victory in the category, in also his home GP, in Rimini. He finished the season with 127 points, 8th in the overall standings.

The 2017 Moto2 World Championship was a down year for Baldassarri. He started the season with an 8th place in Qatar, and 4th place in Argentina, before crashing out in Le Mans and Mugello. He had another 4th place in Barcelona, but suffered a crash in Assen, causing him to miss the Dutch and the German GP, where he was replaced by Federico Fuligni. Baldassarri rode the rest of the season not fully fit to ride, and only finished with 51 points, 16th in the final standings.

Flexbox HP40 (2018–2020)
Baldassarri would switch teams for the 2018 Moto2 World Championship, leaving Forward Racing for HP40 Pons Racing on a three year deal. Fully healed, he had a bounce-back year, starting the season with a 2nd place podium in Qatar, and a 4th place in Argentina. He absolutely dominated the weekend in Jerez, completing the weekend hattrick: pole position, fastest lap, and race win, and he did this by leading for every lap in the race as well. He finished 2nd in his home GP in Mugello, making it three podiums in six races. The middle of his season was disappointing however, finishing outside of the points in the Netherlands, Germany, and Austria too. Baldassarri would finish off the season with one good race, and one bad race: he was 3rd in Aragón, retired in Thailand (after starting from Pole position), was 2nd in Japan, 22nd in Australia, 6th in Malaysia, and retired from the season closing race in Valencia. He finished 5th in the championship with 162 points, in front of riders like Joan Mir, Luca Marini, Fabio Quartararo, Iker Lecuona, and Remy Gardner.

The 2019 Moto2 World Championship would start incredibly well for Baldassarri, winning the first two races of the year in Qatar and Argentina, before crashing out from third in the USA. He would win the next race in Jerez, making it three wins out of four rounds. He would not get back on the podium for the rest of the season though, finishing with 171 points, and 7th in the championship standings.

The 2020 season started off well, with Baldassarri finishing the opening round at Qatar in 2nd, but just like 2019, he could not score another podium for the remainder of the season, a 5th place in Valencia was as close as he got. He finished 12th in the standings, with only 71 points, and was not given a contract extension by Pons Racing.

MV Agusta Forward Racing (2021)
In his eighth Moto2 season, Baldassarri signed back with Forward Racing on a one year contract, partnering Simone Corsi again. Forward Racing got its chassis and motorcycle from MV Agusta, who struggled to build a competitive bike for the 2021 season, the pair of riders only scoring 19 points throughout the whole year. Corsi finished with 16 points, a 9th place in Le Mans, a 10th place in Aragón, and a 13th place in Austin, while also qualifying himself to Pole position in the season closer in Valencia, earning himself a ride for 2022. Baldassarri on the other hand had his worst season in the category, finishing in the points just twice, a 14th place in Portimao, and a 15th place in Jerez. He was not given a new contract, the team instead choosing to go with Corsi, and Marcos Ramírez for 2022.

Supersport World Championship

Evan Bros. WorldSSP Yamaha Team (2022)
He competed in the 2022 Supersport World Championship, with the Evan Bros. WorldSSP Yamaha Team.

Superbike World Championship

GMT94 Yamaha (from 2023)
Baldassari graduated to Superbike World Championship riding for GMT94 Yamaha in the following season.

Career statistics

Red Bull MotoGP Rookies Cup

Races by year
(key) (Races in bold indicate pole position, races in italics indicate fastest lap)

CEV Buckler Moto3 Championship

Races by year
(key) (Races in bold indicate pole position, races in italics indicate fastest lap)

Grand Prix motorcycle racing

By season

By class

Races by year
(key) (Races in bold indicate pole position; races in italics indicate fastest lap)

Supersport World Championship

Races by year
(key) (Races in bold indicate pole position; races in italics indicate fastest lap)

Superbike World Championship

By season

Races by year
(key) (Races in bold indicate pole position) (Races in italics indicate fastest lap)

* Season still in progress.

References

External links

1996 births
Living people
Italian motorcycle racers
Moto3 World Championship riders
Moto2 World Championship riders
Supersport World Championship riders
Superbike World Championship riders